Litchfield is a city in and the county seat of Meeker County, Minnesota, United States. The population was 6,624 at the 2020 census.

History
Immigration to the county was slow until the St. Paul, Minneapolis and Manitoba Railroad, later the called St. Paul and Pacific and then the Great Northern, started coming through the area in 1869. The first train to arrive was a construction train on August 13, 1869.

The town site was laid out in 1869 with agriculture and agriculture related industries making up a large base of the economy.

The town's first post office opened in a home in September 20, 1869. It later moved to the northwest corner of Sibley Avenue and Second Street, to a clothing store owned by the town's first official postmaster.

Town name
The settlers living in the area that is now Litchfield, named their settlement Ness on April 5, 1858, after many of the first settlers’ home - the parish of Næs in the traditional region of Hallingdal, Norway.

Litchfield got its name from a man named Electus Bachus Darwin Litchfield. He was a contractor, an investor, and a stockholder in the St. Paul and Pacific Railroad which originally went from St. Paul to St. Cloud and was built from 1862 to 1864.  Later, his investments provided the means for building a more southern line through Meeker County to Breckenridge.

Village of Litchfield was originally called several different names including Round Lake, Ripley, and finally Ness. Litchfield was originally a portion of a congressional township named Round Lake, but most people called it Ripley after Ripley Lake one mile from its center.

The people of Ness were permitted to vote on the actual chartered village name of their township. Electus Litchfield donated grants of $2000 each to various religious sects in town to build churches, the Episcopal and Presbyterian churches being two of them. The Presbyterian Church, Litchfield's first church, was built in 1870.

The majority of the 350 people voted for the name Litchfield over Ness and the township of Litchfield was chartered as a village on February 29, 1872.  The first village council meeting was held on April 5, 1872, in the railroad's land office. Jesse Vawter Branham, Jr. was elected the President of the Council.

Early history as village

While most sidewalks in town were made of wood, the first cement sidewalk in Litchfield was laid in 1895 in the 200 block of Sibley Avenue.

By 1871, the village had grown to double the population of Forest City, Minnesota. The railroad put up a twenty-five by sixty-foot one-story building called an "immigrant's reception house." In addition to Litchfield, the railroad put immigrant houses in villages along the railroad's lines in the 1870s including in Willmar, Benson, Morris, and Breckenridge, Minnesota.  The houses were "fitted up with cooking-stoves, washing conveniences, and beds." Newly arriving immigrants were given shelter in the reception houses and the chance to buy food and clothing at cost from the railroad while they looked for land in the area.

Early history as city
The Village of Litchfield incorporated as a city in 1943.

Geography

U.S. Highway 12 and Minnesota State Highways 22 and 24 are three of the main routes in the city.

Climate

Demographics

2010 census
As of the census of 2010, there were 6,726 people, 2,747 households, and 1,749 families residing in the city. The racial makeup of the city was 95.8% White, 0.5% African American, 0.1% Native American, 0.1% Asian, 2.6% from other races, and 0.8% from two or more races. Hispanic or Latino of any race were 7.2% of the population.

There were 2,747 households, of which 30.8% had children under the age of 18 living with them, 48.4% were married couples living together, 10.7% had a female householder with no husband present, 4.6% had a male householder with no wife present, and 36.3% were non-families. 32.0% of all households were made up of individuals, and 16.1% had someone living alone who was 65 years of age or older. The average household size was 2.37 and the average family size was 2.98.

The median age in the city was 39.6 years. 24.9% of residents were under the age of 18; 7.3% were between the ages of 18 and 24; 23.9% were from 25 to 44; 25.6% were from 45 to 64; and 18.4% were 65 years of age or older. The gender makeup of the city was 48.8% male and 51.2% female.

Notable people
 Bernie Bierman (1894-1977) - Minnesota Gophers football coach, won five national championships, seven Big Ten titles.
Florence Riddick Boys (1873-1963), Indiana journalist (first woman editor in the country with a syndicated column, suffragist - County Chair of the suffrage group "The Woman's Franchise", first Woman's Publicity Director to write publicly for the Republican National Committee, Indiana State Probation Officer, born in Litchfield
 John Carlson, Jr. – football player, Minnesota Vikings, Seattle Seahawks, Arizona Cardinals
 Herbert W. Chilstrom - Presiding Bishop (1987–95) of Evangelical Lutheran Church in America
 John W. Foss - US Army (Ret.) four-star general and former commander of Training and Doctrine Command
 Peter E. Hanson (1845–1914) - politician and businessman
 Ann D. Montgomery, Federal judge of United States District Court for the District of Minnesota.
 William A. Nolen (1928-1986) - surgeon and author, wrote syndicated medical advice column that appeared in McCall's magazine for many years; his best-known book, The Making of a Surgeon, was written in 1970; appeared multiple times on Johnny Carson's Tonight Show
 Philip J. Palm- newspaper editor and politician
 Wally Pikal (1927-2017) - entertainer and musician, Minnesota Music Hall of Fame inductee, resident of Litchfield for more than 30 years; appeared on The Tonight Show, Mike Douglas Show and Bozo's Circus, played with such notables as Frank Sinatra Jr, Conway Twitty, and Victor Borge
 Michael Shaw - Minnesota Music Hall of Fame, Mid-America Music Hall of Fame, first open heart surgery survivor, operation by Drs. Lillihei and Lewis
 Gale Sondergaard (1899–1985) - Academy Award-winning actress 1936 (first Best Supporting Actress award); appeared in more than 40 Hollywood films, numerous TV shows, radio, Chautauqua circuit and many Broadway plays 
 Hester Sondergaard (1903–1994) - Famous radio (CBS, NBC Mystery Theatre, Arch Obeler) character actress working with notables such as Ingrid Bergman, Burgess Meredith, Robert Mitchum, and Glenn Ford, she appeared on Broadway and was an actress in three movies (Seeds of Freedom, Naked City, Jigsaw).
 Dan Sperry - magician; signature style of magic is called "Shock Illusion," performing cutting-edge magic incorporating razor blades, needles,  broken glass, voodoo and industrial shredders.

Historic sites
 Grand Army of the Republic Hall (G.A.R.) was founded in 1885 by Civil War veterans, who called themselves the "Boys of '61". Membership was limited to the Union (Northern) vets of the Civil War whose motto was "Fraternity, Charity, and Loyalty". The Hall remains exactly as it was when the "Boys of '61" met there. The Litchfield G.A.R. Hall is one of very few left in the nation and the only authentic one remaining in Minnesota. The G.A.R. Hall was added to the National Register of Historic Places on May 21, 1975.
 Litchfield Commercial Historic District is an unusually intact business district of a small Midwestern agricultural trade center of the late 19th and early 20th centuries with 36 contributing properties mostly built between 1882 and 1940.
 Henry Ames House was built in 1888-1889 by area pioneer Henry Ames. The house is the only original structure that remains from what was known as the Litchfield Brickyard that operated during the years of 1883–1900.  The house was added to the National Register of Historic Places on August 9, 1984.
 The Litchfield Opera House was built in 1900, the building is a darling of St. Paul architect William T. Towner, who designed it with a unique “Renaissance Revival” façade.  Considered a jewel on the prairie; many people came to watch the performances of the traveling shows that came to the Opera House.  The Litchfield Opera House was added to the National Register of Historic Places on October 4, 1984.
 The Little Red Schoolhouse District 59 was built in 1913 on an acre of land 6 miles south of Litchfield. The architecture is a classic revival-style featuring a single story, red brick exterior, hip roof, and eight white Doric columns, was constructed at a cost of $3,500.
 Manannah (Union) Century Church, called Manannah Union Church when it was built in 1897, relied on traveling pastors to lead its flock. When membership dwindled in 1985, the church closed its doors. Esther Hegg, a longtime parishioner, bought the church at an auction. Hegg then lead the charge to move the church to the Meeker County Fairgrounds where it stands today.
 Ness Church was organized in 1861. It is one of the state's oldest historical sites and the first organized church in Meeker County. Buried in its cemetery are the first five victims of the U.S. Dakota War.
 Trinity Episcopal Church  Founded in 1871, the church was entered into the National Register of Historic Places on June 20, 1975.  The architecture of the church is attributed to Richard Upjohn, a famous architect from New York known for Carpenter Gothic architecture.  Upjohn founded the American Institute of Architects and served as its first president. The door and side entry belltower, lancet windows, and batten walls are typical characteristics of Carpenter Gothic architecture.

References

External links

 Litchfield Chamber of Commerce
 Litchfield Independent Review newspaper site
 Meeker County Historical Society

Cities in Minnesota
Cities in Meeker County, Minnesota
County seats in Minnesota